is a city located in Gifu, Japan. , the city had an estimated population of 161,539, and a population density of 782 persons per km2 in 65,931 households. Every November the city holds a Bashō Festival.

Geography
Ōgaki is located in the northwest area of the Nōbi Plain in Gifu Prefecture and is known as being the most centrally-located city in Japan. As a result of its 2006 merger with the town of Kamiishizu (from Yōrō District), and the town of Sunomata (from Anpachi District), the city consists of three disconnected regions, with Sunomata in the east, the original Ōgaki in the center, and Kamiishizu in the southwest.

The main river flowing through the city is the Ibi River; however, the Nagara River forms the border between Ōgaki and the neighboring cities of Gifu and Hashima.

Neighbouring municipalities
Gifu Prefecture
Gifu
Hashima
Mizuho
Anpachi
Gōdo
Ikeda
Wanouchi
Sekigahara
Tarui
Yōrō
Mie Prefecture
Inabe
Shiga Prefecture
Maibara
Taga

Climate
The city has a climate characterized by characterized by hot and humid summers, and mild winters (Köppen climate classification Cfa).

Demographics
Per Japanese census data, the population of Ōgaki peaked around the year 2000 and has declined slightly since.

History
The area around Ōgaki was part of traditional Mino Province.  During the Edo period, the area developed as a castle town for Ōgaki Domain under the Tokugawa shogunate.  In the post-Meiji restoration cadastral reforms, the town of Ogaki was established within Anpachi District, Gifu Prefecture with the creation of the modern municipalities system on July 1, 1889. It was raised to city status on April 1, 1918. The city suffered severe flooding during the 1934 Muroto typhoon, and was largely destroyed in six air raids in 1945.

Municipal timeline
 April 1918: Gained city status
 April 1928: Merged with parts of the village of Kitakuise, Anpachi District (specifically the localities of Kido, Minamiisshiki, Kasagi, Kasanui and Gama)
 December 1934: Merged with village of Minamikuise, Anpachi District
 June 1935: Merged with village of Tagishima, Anpachi District
 June 1936: Merged with village of Yasui, Anpachi District
 February 1940: Merged with villages of Urū and Shizusato, Fuwa District
 October 1947: Merged with villages of Ayasato, Fuwa District, and Sumoto, Anpachi District
 June 1948: Merged with village of Asakusa, Anpachi District
 October 1948: Merged with village of Kawanami and the Maze part of Maki, Anpachi District
 April 1949: Merged with village of Nakagawa, Anpachi District
 April 1951: Merged with village of Wagō, Anpachi District
 June 1952: Merged with village of Mitsukoshi, Anpachi District
 October 1954: Merged with village of Arasaki, Fuwa District
 September 1967: Merged with town of Akasaka, Fuwa District
 April 1988: Established city constitution
 March 27, 2006: Merged with towns of Kamiishizu, Yōrō District, and Sunomata, Anpachi District

Government

Ōgaki has a mayor-council form of government with a directly elected mayor and a unicameral city legislature of 22 members.

Economy
Ibiden, a global electronic components manufacturer, is headquartered in the city.

Education

Universities and colleges
Institute of Advanced Media Arts and Sciences (IAMAS)
Gifu Keizai University
Ogaki Women's College
Institute for Fashion Studies (IFS)
Ogaki Nursing College (moved to Ogaki Medical Association March 31, 2006)
Nihon Information Processing College
Nihon General Business College
Nihon-Chūō Nursing College Ogaki
Nihon-Chūō Gakuen Culinary College

Primary and secondary education
Ōgaki has 22 public elementary schools and ten public middle schools operated by the city government and one private middle school. The city has nine public high school operated by the Gifu Prefectural Board of Education, and two private high schools. The prefecture also operates one special education school.
Ogaki Kita Senior High School
Ogaki Higashi Senior High School
Ogaki Minami Senior High School
Ogaki Nishi Senior High School
Ogaki Technical High School
Ogaki-Shogyo Business High School
Nihon University Ogaki Senior High School
Hirano Gakuen
Ogaki Sakura High School
Ogaki School for Handicapped (primary through senior high)

International schools
 Escola Brasileira Prof. Kawase - Brazilian primary school

Transportation

Railway
 - JR Central - Tōkaidō Main Line
 -   - 
  Tarumi Railway - Tarumi Railway Tarumi Line
   -  
 Yōrō Railway Yōrō Line
 -  -  -  -  -  -  
Seino Railway (freight railway)
Seino Ichihashi Line: Mino Akasaka Station, Otomezaka Station, Saruiwa Station, Ichihashi Station
Seino Hirui Line: Mino Akasaka Station, Mino Okubo Station, Hirui Station

Highway
 Meishin Expressway-  Ogaki IC
 Tōkai-Kanjō Expressway - Ogaki-nishi IC

Twin towns – sister cities

Ōgaki is twinned with:

 Glen Eira, Australia
 Handan, China
 Hioki, Japan

Friendship cities

 Beaverton, United States
 Changwon, South Korea
 Eugene, United States
 Kagoshima, Japan
 Namur, Belgium
 Stuttgart, Germany

Local attractions

Akasaka-juku, the 56th station on the Nakasendō
Kokubun-ji ruins
Basho's Oku no Hosomichi Haiku Journey Memorial
Ōgaki Castle
Softopia Japan
Sumiyoshi Lighthouse
Sunomata Castle

Notable people

, kendo teacher
, Japanese businessman
, professional wrestler
Ikutaro Tokoro, patriot in the closing days of Tokugawa shogunate
, architect known for the construction and design of National Diet Building
Yasufumi Tanahashi, politician
Shigeki Hosokawa, actor
Yoshiyuki Ishihara, professional baseball player
Shōta Ōno, professional baseball player
Yoshitoki Ōima, manga artist

References

External links

 

 
Cities in Gifu Prefecture